The Israel women's national rugby sevens team represents Israel in rugby sevens. They compete in the Rugby Europe Women's Sevens regularly. Israel won the 2021 Rugby Europe Women's Sevens Conference in Belgrade.

History 
The Israeli women's national sevens team was formed in 2005 and have competed in the Rugby Europe Women's Sevens ever since. In their first tournament the national team finished in a respectable 9th place (bowl winners), with wins over Malta and Austria.
In the 2006 championship, Israel won the 5th place (plate winners) with wins over Bosnia, Luxembourg, Hungary and Malta.
The 2007 tournament featured a fresh team with many young players. After winning against Luxembourg, Latvia, and Hungary, they lost in the plate final to Denmark.
2008 was a highlight year for them, they played in the qualifying tournament in Bosnia and finished 3rd, losing only to Romania (eventual tournament champion) and Finland (2nd place). The team recorded wins over Croatia, Georgia, Serbia, Austria and a thrilling 3rd place win over Bulgaria (7–5).
They qualified for the European championship (which doubled as a world cup qualifier) and managed to score one win there, a last gasp win over the Czech Republic.

Tournament History

Rugby Europe Women's Sevens

Players

Recent Squad 
Squad to the 2021 Rugby Europe Women's Sevens Conference:

 Amit Aharon
 Daria Velikovsky
 Debora Mesri
 Lily Wasser
 Limor Lev
 Meital Friebach
 Michal Lahack
 Naama Badehi
 Natalie Klotz
 Perach Ittiel
 Shoshana Kranish
 Zohar Tavori

References 

Rugby union in Israel
Women's national rugby sevens teams